Ariel Waldman is an explorer, creator and writer specializing in the intersection of science, space, technology and art. She describes herself as "on a mission to make science and space exploration disruptively accessible."

Waldman is the global director of Science Hack Day, which organizes events worldwide to bring together people to make things using science. The idea sprang from a South by Southwest panel she organized in 2010 on how to make use of open data. She is also the founder of SpaceHack.org, a directory of ways for anyone to participate in space exploration.

Waldman chairs the external council for NASA's Innovative Advanced Concepts program, which provides grants to develop innovative ideas in aerospace that could transform future NASA missions. She co-authored "Pathways to Exploration," a 2014 report from the National Academies on the future of human spaceflight.

In 2018, she traveled to Antarctica for five weeks as a principal investigator with the National Science Foundation's Antarctic Artists and Writers program. She climbed glaciers and dived beneath the sea ice in order to photograph microbes living in extreme environments. The resulting project, Life Under the Ice, features microscopy photos of bacteria, diatoms, tardigrades and other Antarctic life forms, and was the topic of her 2020 TED Talk, "The Invisible Life Hidden Beneath Antarctica's Ice".

In 2013, Waldman received an honor from the Obama White House for being a Champion of Change in citizen science, "for her dedication to increasing public engagement in science and science literacy." She is a graduate of the Art Institute of Pittsburgh.

Books 

 What's It Like in Space? Stories from Astronauts Who've Been There.  (April 2016), including illustrations by Brian Standeford.
 Out There  (August 2023), with foreword by Mae Jemison.

References

External links 

 Her website: 
 Her TEDx talk, "How Anyone Can Be A Space Explorer": 
 Her TED talk, "The Invisible Life Hidden Beneath Antarctica's Ice": 
 Her StarTalk radio interview with Bill Nye: 

Living people
Space advocates
Science communicators
Year of birth missing (living people)